The American electro house DJ and producer Steve Aoki has released 7 studio albums, 5 extended plays, and 107 singles (including three as a featured artist).

Albums

Studio albums

Remix albums

Compilation albums

Mixtapes

Remix albums

Video albums

Extended plays

Singles

As lead artist

As featured artist

Other charted songs

Guest appearances

Remixes

Notes

References

Discographies of American artists
Electronic music discographies